Zavodsky City District may refer to:
Zavodsky City District, Russia, the name of several city districts in Russia
Zavodski District, a city district of Minsk, Belarus
Zavodskyi District (disambiguation), name of several city districts in Ukraine

See also
Zavodskoy (disambiguation)
Zavodsky (disambiguation)